is a Japanese athlete. She competed in the women's javelin throw at the 1984 Summer Olympics.

References

1957 births
Living people
Athletes (track and field) at the 1984 Summer Olympics
Japanese female javelin throwers
Olympic athletes of Japan
Place of birth missing (living people)
Asian Games medalists in athletics (track and field)
Asian Games bronze medalists for Japan
Athletes (track and field) at the 1982 Asian Games
Medalists at the 1982 Asian Games
20th-century Japanese women